The 800 metres at the World Championships in Athletics has been contested by both men and women since the inaugural edition in 1983. It is the second most prestigious title in the discipline after the 800 metres at the Olympics. The competition format typically has two qualifying rounds leading to a final between eight athletes.

The championship records for the event are 1:43.06 for men, set by Billy Konchellah in 1987, and 1:54.68 for women, set by Jarmila Kratochvílová in 1983. Set at the inaugural championships, Kratochvílová's record is the longest-standing record of the competition. The 800 m world record has never been broken at the competition by either men or women.

Maria Mutola is the most successful athlete of the event: from a period spanning 1993 to 2003, she won three gold medals, one silver and one bronze in the World Championships 800 m. The most successful man is Wilson Kipketer, who won three straight titles from 1995 to 1999. Only two other people, Billy Konchellah and Ana Fidelia Quirot, have won two world championship titles in the event. Yuriy Borzakovskiy, though never a champion, has won the most medals in the men's competition, with two silver and two bronze medals.

Kenya is the most successful nation in the discipline, with five gold medals in the men's, two in the women's race, and a total of 13 medals overall. The actions of Mutola and Kipketer alone rank Mozambique at the top of the women's rankings and Denmark second in the men's medal table. Cuba—the second most successful nation among women—has won three women's gold medals. South Africa is the only nation besides Kenya to have provided both a men's and women's winner. Russia has the second highest overall medal tally, with eleven medals across the men's and women's divisions, but it has also provided six of the eight athletes sanctioned for doping at this World Championship distance.

Age
All information from IAAF

 The exact date of birth of the youngest male participant, Mohamed Abd el Rahman, is unknown but he remains the youngest given his known year of birth and calculating from 1 January of that year.

Doping
A total of nine athletes, all of them women and seven of them Russian, have had their 800 m results annulled at the World Championships due to doping infractions. The first was Delisa Floyd of the United States (1991 semi-finalist) was among the first few women to be disqualified from the championships for doping. The 1993 finalist Liliya Nurutdinova was the only woman disqualified at the 1993 championships. Another Russian, Lyubov Tsyoma, had her semi-final run in 1997 annulled. Ten years passed without incident until a third Russian, Svetlana Cherkasova was struck from the heats for doping in 2007.

Two women semi-finalists were disqualified for doping in 2009: a fourth Russian, Svetlana Klyuka, and Tetiana Petlyuk of Ukraine. Petlyuk was retrospectively banned through a biological passport anomaly and this also took in her run at the 2011 World Championships. That same year two more Russians were disqualified, both of them finalists: Yuliya Rusanova and Yekaterina Kostetskaya.  In 2017, the third Russian finalist, gold medalist Mariya Savinova was banned for life, retroactive to 2010, making it a clean sweep of disqualified Russians in 2011, as well as taking Savinova's silver in 2013.  Both times Alysia Johnson Montaño advanced to take the bronze medal.

Medalists

Men

Multiple medalists

Medalists by country

Women

Multiple medalists

Medalists by country

Championship record progression

Men

Women

References

Bibliography

External links
Official IAAF website

 
World Championships in Athletics 800 metres
Events at the World Athletics Championships